The fifth SS Rotterdam, also known as "The Grande Dame", is a former ocean liner and cruise ship, and has been a hotel ship in Rotterdam, Netherlands since 2010. She was launched by Queen Juliana of the Netherlands in a gala ceremony on 13 September 1958, and was completed the following summer.

The Rotterdam was the last great Dutch "ship of state", employing the finest artisans from the Netherlands in her construction and fitting out process. Her career spanned forty-one years. She sailed from 1959 until her final retirement in September 2000.

Concept and design
Originally she was conceived as a running mate to the popular  launched in 1937, but work was put on hold at the outbreak of World War II in Europe. When economic conditions once again became favorable for completion of the new ship in early 1954, the beginning of the end of ocean liners as basic transport was visible on the horizon.

The designers took this in mind and created a groundbreaking vessel, a two class, horizontally divided ship with movable partitions and a unique double staircase allowing for easy conversion to cruising. The christening and launch on 13 September 1958 by Queen Juliana was a huge crowd puller, with tens of thousands on both banks of the river. Rotterdam's machinery was shifted aft, to the now-traditional two thirds aft position, and in lieu of a funnel twin uptake pipes were fitted. To provide balance, a large deckhouse was built atop the superstructure in the midships position of a typical funnel, a very controversial arrangement at the time.

History

As Rotterdam

Her sea trials and handing over to Holland America Line took place on 20 July 1959, just a few months before her maiden crossing of the Atlantic. On her maiden voyage she carried the then Crown Princess of the Netherlands to New York.

Due to the growing popularity of air travel, an increasing number of transatlantic liners began to disappear from service. This trend led to the Rotterdam's permanent retirement from transatlantic service in 1969. Subsequently, she received a small refit for permanent cruising and began her new life as a full time cruise ship. The Rotterdam also became a one class ship after this refit.

She became increasingly popular throughout the 1970s and early 1980s, with mostly American and Australian passengers. Another refit in 1977 saw her passenger capacity decreased from 1,499 to 1,144. By the 1980s the ship had settled into a routine of winters in the Caribbean and summers in Alaska, with the occasional (and very popular) world cruise. Carnival Cruise Lines took over Holland America Line in 1989.

She remained in service until 1997, when Carnival announced, much to the dismay of the ship's loyal fans, that to upgrade her to meet the new 1997 SOLAS regulations would cost 40 million dollars. While Carnival did have the money necessary to upgrade her, they had been opting to retire what they had supposedly called the "old ship." A replacement, the sixth Rotterdam, was ordered from Fincantieri shipyards in Italy. A gala finale cruise ended her final season on 30 September 1997.

There was a proposal for the Rotterdam to return to her homeport of Rotterdam where she would serve as a hotel ship, but the proposal fell through. There were also rumors of the vessel possibly being sold for scrap in Asia as what happened to the similar looking Canberra. In October 1997, she was sold to Premier Cruise Line (Premier wanted to buy the Canberra first, but P&O refused to sell her to them and was sold for scrap, thus causing Premier to buy Rotterdam instead).

As Rembrandt

Originally, Premier Cruise Line wanted to rename the vessel as The Big Red Boat IV to align her with Premier's other vessels, but public outcry caused Premier to instead renamed her to SS Rembrandt after the Dutch painter. Controversially, Premier was able to refit the Rembrandt for new safety regulations as well as many other things for half the amount Carnival had predicted. Her livery under Premier was the same as her HAL Livery, albeit with the Premier Cruise logo on the stern and her name changed.

She sailed for Premier along with the ex ocean liners Oceanic, Eugenio C and Transvaal Castle, all now named Big Red Boat I, II and III. She continued to serve as a fairly popular cruise ship out of Port Canaveral, Florida until 13 September 2000, when Premier Cruises shut down.

It was midnight when this was made official and the captain of the Rembrandt was ordered to dock in Halifax, Nova Scotia and offload all. She was subsequently placed under arrest by the Halifax Sheriff's department until the next morning, then days later she sailed to be laid up in Freeport, Bahamas.

For three years, the Rembrandt was laid up with other Premier Cruise Line vessels in Freeport, Bahamas. There were fears that she may be sold for scrap after her some of their fleetmates were sold for scrap in Asia. Then in May 2003, the Rembrandt was purchased by the Rotterdam Dry Dock Company (RDDC), with the plan to return the ex-Rotterdam to her homeport of Rotterdam where she would serve as a hotel ship.

Restoration and hotel opening

On 12 July 2004, Rembrandt arrived at Gibraltar for asbestos encapsulation and removal performed by the Cuddy Group of the UK. She next visited Cadiz where her hull was repainted its original Holland America grey, and was also renamed back to Rotterdam. She then moved on to Poland and Germany for final restoration. She returned to the city of Rotterdam on 8 August 2008.

She opened to the public on 15 February 2010 as a combination museum/hotel and school for vocational training. On 12 June 2013, she was sold to WestCord Hotels, which also owns the Hotel New York located in the former Holland America Line headquarters building in Rotterdam.

Since 2018, Rotterdam is the last remaining ex-Premier Cruise Line vessel still afloat, after the former Starship Atlantic was scrapped in 2018.

References

Further reading

External links

SS Rotterdam official website
Steamship Rotterdam Foundation
Cruise Portalia info and gallery on SS Rotterdam
Maritime Matters - SS Rembrandt
Willem's Maritime Pages
Vereniging "De Lijn"

Video Clips of Rotterdam (2013)

Museum ships in the Netherlands
Ships of the Holland America Line
Steamships of the Netherlands
1958 ships